Darband-e Vosta (also Romanized as Darband-e Vosţá; also known as Darbandī-ye Vosţá) is a village in Miankuh Rural District, Chapeshlu District, Dargaz County, Razavi Khorasan Province, Iran. At the 2006 census, its population was 25, in 9 families.

References 

Populated places in Dargaz County